Radio România Cultural is the Romanian Radio Broadcasting Corporation's second national channel.

Its schedule concentrates on the production and presentation of dramatic and musical performances (both live and recorded), broadcast coverage of cultural and literary festivals and events, and the provision of special programmes for children and schools.

External links
 Listen to Radio România Cultural live on the Internet

Eastern Bloc mass media
Radio stations established in 1952
Radio stations in Romania
Romanian-language radio stations
Cultural